Presidential elections were held in Bulgaria on 6 November 2016, alongside a referendum on changes to the electoral system and political party funding. The second round was held on 13 November 2016, resulting in the victory of Rumen Radev.

Electoral system
The President of Bulgaria is elected using the two-round system. For the first time, voters were allowed to vote for none of the above.

Candidates
The incumbent President, Rosen Plevneliev, announced in May 2016 that he would not be running for re-election.

Official candidates

Declined

Opinion polls

First round

Second round

Results

Voter demographics
Gallup exit polling suggested the following demographic breakdown.

Aftermath
Following the results of the second round, Prime Minister and GERB leader Boiko Borisov tendered his resignation. Two days later, on 16 November, the National Assembly voted 218–0 to accept it, resulting in early parliamentary elections.

References

Bulgaria
2016 elections in Bulgaria
November 2016 events in Europe
Presidential elections in Bulgaria